Enetai is a census-designated place (CDP) located in Kitsap County, Washington. The population was 2,286 at the 2010 census.

Demographics
In 2010, it had a population of 2,286 inhabitants. 1,093 are male. 1,193 are female.

Geography
Enetai is located at coordinates 47°35′18″N 122°36′21″W.

References

Census-designated places in Kitsap County, Washington